The Lion and the Cobra is the debut album by Irish singer Sinéad O'Connor, released on 4 November 1987 by Ensign and Chrysalis Records.

O'Connor recorded the album while in the later stages of pregnancy with her first child. The title of the album is from  "you will tread upon the lion and cobra", and the track "Never Get Old" opens with an Irish language recital of Psalm 91 by singer Enya.

The photograph of O'Connor on the album cover was taken by Haysi Fantayzee member Kate Garner. The covers of the United States and Canada issues differed from the European release, as it was decided a more subdued pose would present a "softer" image of the star.

The first single, "Troy", peaked at number eight in the Netherlands and number 12 in Belgium. It was not a hit in Britain when it was released there in 1987.

The second single – "Mandinka" – was a mainstream pop hit in the UK, peaking at number 17 in the singles chart in February 1988, and at number six in her native Ireland.

"I Want Your (Hands on Me)" was featured in the 1988 horror film, A Nightmare on Elm Street 4: The Dream Master. It was used in a prominent characters' death sequence, as well as the films end credits. As the third single from the album in the UK (after "Troy" and "Mandinka"), it peaked at number 77 in May 1988. The single remix includes a rap by MC Lyte, not included on the album version. There are two mixes featuring the rap: the "Dance mix" and the "Street Mix".

The album charted worldwide, reaching number 27 in the United Kingdom and number 36 on the US Billboard 200.

"I'm really proud of them," she remarked of the album's songs, and her reluctance to perform them, in 2005. "For a little girl to have written some of those songs… I wrote my songs as therapy, if you like. I don't go back to it. I don't want to go there emotionally. I haven't paid all this money for therapy for fucking nothing."

Critical reception

The Lion and the Cobra received critical acclaim. In a write-up for Slant Magazines list of the best albums of the 1980s, where it placed at number 46, Sal Cinquemani called The Lion and the Cobra "regal, majestic, and allegorical" and "one of the most electrifying debuts in rock history." It was ranked at number 44 on Pitchforks 2018 list of the best 1980s albums, with Cameron Cook saying that its "themes of patriotism, sexuality, Catholicism, and social oppression set the stage for a career marked by a resolute sense of independence."

Track listing

Personnel 
Credits adapted from the album's liner notes.
 Sinéad O'Connor – vocals, electric guitar, producer, audio mixing, arranger
 Marco Pirroni – electric guitar, acoustic guitar
 Richard "Spike" Holifield – bass guitar
 Rob Dean – electric guitar, acoustic guitar
 John Reynolds – drums, programming
 Mike Clowes – synthesizer, keyboards, string arrangement
 Kevin Mooney – guitar, bass guitar
 Gavyn Wright – orchestra director
 Enya – speaking part
 Leslie Winer – spoken words
Technical
 Kevin Moloney – producer, engineer, audio mixing
 Fachtna Ó Ceallaigh – audio mixing 
 Terence Morris – mixing
 Lloyd Phillips – mixing
 Chris Birkett – mixing
 Jack Adams – mastering
 Kate Garner –  photography
 Kim Bowen – photography
 John Maybury – art direction, cover art
 Steve Horse – art direction, cover art

Charts

Weekly charts

Year-end charts

Certifications and sales

!scope="row"|Worldwide
|
|2,500,000
|-

References

1987 debut albums
Sinéad O'Connor albums
Chrysalis Records albums